Mark McMahon (May 16, 1878 – February 19, 1947) was the University of Oklahoma's fourth football coach. He coached the Sooners during the 1902 and 1903 seasons, leading the team to a combined record 11–7–3. McMahon played for the Texas Longhorns during college. He took the coaching job to help pay off student loans he had incurred as a law student at Texas. McMahon is credited for introducing the first tackling dummy at Oklahoma. He also preferred long, hard schedules and because of that, the 1903 team played 10 of 12 games on the road. After repaying his law school debts, McMahon moved to Durant, Oklahoma in the winter of 1903 to practice law.

Head coaching record

References

External links
 Mark McMahon on Find a Grave

1878 births
1947 deaths
19th-century players of American football
American football tackles
Oklahoma Sooners football coaches
Texas Longhorns football players
People from Durant, Oklahoma
People from Fannin County, Texas
Oklahoma lawyers